Swig may refer to:

 Swig, a Utah-based beverage chain
 SWIG (Simplified Wrapper and Interface Generator), an open source software tool
 Swig Program in Jewish Studies and Social Justice program at the University of San Francisco
 Benjamin Swig (1893–1980), American real estate developer and philanthropist, son of Simon
 Melvin Swig (1917–1993), American real estate developer and philanthropist, son of Benjamin
 Simon Swig (1862–1939) American banker, politician and philanthropist

See also
 
 Swiggy, an Indian food delivery app